Löwenbräu is a brewery in Munich. Its name is German for "lion's brew". Most Löwenbräu beers are marketed as being brewed according to the Reinheitsgebot, the German beer purity regulation of 1516.

History
Löwenbräu is alleged to have been founded around 1383. In 1524, Jörg Schnaitter, a pierprew (beer brewer), is mentioned in connection with the property at the address 17 Löwengrube. The brewery was first mentioned in 1746 in the Munich tax records. The lion emblem originates from a 17th-century fresco in the brewing house, depicting Daniel in the lions' den.

In 1818, Georg Brey, a brewer of peasant origins, bought the brewery, which began to grow under his management. In 1826, brewing operations began moving to a new location on Nymphenburger Strasse; the move was completed in 1851. By 1863, Löwenbräu had become the largest brewery in Munich, producing a quarter of the city's beer output.

The brewery was formally incorporated in 1872 under the name Aktienbrauerei zum Löwenbräu. As brewer and owner, Ludwig Brey acquired the neighboring properties of Nikolaus Nassl, a Bierwirt (seller of beer). By Brey's order in 1882 and 1883, the Rank brothers built the Löwenbräukeller, according to the plans of Albert Schmidt on the brewery's property. The grand opening of the Löwenbräukeller was on 14 June 1883. In 1886, the lion trademark was registered. Around the turn of the century, Löwenbräu was the largest brewery in Germany, though strongly dependent on exports.

The export business was affected by World War I; for example the Löwenbräu London Depot closed for the duration, making its employees redundant.

In 1921, Löwenbräu merged with Unionsbräu Schülein & Cie and Munich Bürgerbräu, two other breweries. These mergers brought Löwenbräu more property, including the Bürgerbräukeller. In 1923, this beer hall became noted as the location of the unsuccessful Beer Hall Putsch which Adolf Hitler led against the government of the German state of Bavaria, of which Munich was the state capital. In 1928, the company's beer production first exceeded a million hectoliters per year. The supervisory board of the new corporation included Wilhelm von Finck, one of the owners of Bürgerbräu, and Joseph Schülein, who was Jewish. Schülein's later tenure as the company's owner led the Nazis to deride Löwenbräu beer as "Jewsbeer". An Allied air raid in 1945 destroyed the brewery. After the war, an agreement was reached with the Schülein heirs, who had fled to the United States, to ensure the survival of the brewery. It resumed the export of beer in 1948—first to Switzerland.

Löwenbräu's market position in Upper Bavaria, and financing made possible by its large real estate holdings, helped drive worldwide sales of their beer. In North America, Löwenbräu came to be considered the archetype of Munich beer, as shown by its presence at the Montreal Expo in 1967.

In 1975, Miller Brewing acquired the North American rights to Löwenbräu. After two years of exports, Miller began brewing Löwenbräu domestically with an Americanized recipe, and exports of Munich Löwenbräu to North America ceased. Anheuser-Busch, whose Michelob brand Miller had intended Löwenbräu to compete with, called the attention of regulators and the public to the changes Miller had made to mass-produce the beer for the American market, changes which introduced artificial ingredients that would not have been allowed under the German Reinheitsgebot that Miller had advertised Löwenbräu as being compliant with. No regulatory action was taken, but sales of Löwenbräu dropped to the point where it was clear the brand would not seriously compete with Michelob for the premium-beer segment.

The "Here's to Good Friends" jingle, originally performed by baritone jazz singer Arthur Prysock and then later by other various singers, including Clint Holmes, ran from 1977 to 1985.

In 1999, the North American rights to Löwenbräu passed to the Labatt Brewing Company, which began to brew Löwenbräu in Canada for both the Canadian and US markets with the same recipe used in Germany. Labatt's production of Löwenbräu ended in 2002 and exports of Munich Löwenbräu to North America resumed, although on a much smaller scale than had been the case before the Miller deal.

In 1997, Löwenbräu merged with Spaten-Franziskaner-Bräu to form the Spaten-Löwenbräu-Gruppe. Proposals to relocate the Löwenbräu brewery out of the Munich city center have failed, despite the company's international ownership. Today, Löwenbräu has one of the oldest beer gardens in Munich.

In 2014, Labatt regained the Canadian rights to Löwenbräu and began brewing Löwenbräu at their London, Ontario brewery, producing a smaller, can and soon after releasing a  bottle. In November 2014, Canadian sommelier, wine consultant and writer Jamie Drummond called for a boycott of the Canadian made Löwenbräu in the online publication "Good Food Revolution", claiming the new product to be inferior, different in taste to the original.

Oktoberfest

Löwenbräu beer has been served at every Oktoberfest in Munich since 1810. Because only beers that are brewed in Munich are permitted to be sold at Oktoberfest, Löwenbräu is one of six breweries represented, along with Augustinerbräu, Hofbräuhaus, Hacker-Pschorr, Paulaner, and Spaten. For the Oktoberfest, Löwenbräu brews a special Märzen beer called Oktoberfestbier or Wiesenbier ("meadow beer," referring to the Bavarian name of the festival site, the "Wiesn"). Two of the large tents at Oktoberfest, the Löwenbräu-Festhalle and the Schützenfestzelt, are sponsored by Löwenbräu.

Oktoberfest beer, also known as Münchner Bier ("Munich beer"), is a registered trademark of the Club of Munich Brewers; Bavarian beer (Bayrisches Bier) and Munich beer in particular (Münchner Bier) are protected by the European Union as a PGI.

Beers
Löwenbräu Original for Export
Löwenbräu Münchner Hell: a Munich Helles (5.2% ABV)
Löwenbräu Münchner Dunkel: a dark lager (5.5% ABV)
Löwenbräu Triumphator: a doppelbock (7.5% ABV)
Löwenbräu Alkoholfrei: a non-alcoholic beer
Löwenbräu Urtyp: a traditional helles (5.4% ABV)
Löwenbräu Pils (formerly "der Löwenbräu"): the hoppiest of Munich's pilsners (5.4% ABV)
Löwenbräu Dunkle Weisse: a hefeweizen (5.2% ABV)
Löwenbräu Löwen Weisse Hell: a hefeweizen (5.2% ABV)
Löwenbräu Radler Beer: a radler (2.5% ABV)
Löwenbräu Oktoberfestbier: a Märzen brewed for Oktoberfest (6.1% ABV)

See also
 List of brewing companies in Germany

References

Further reading
 Wolfgang Behringer: Löwenbräu. Von den Anfängen des Münchner Brauwesens bis zur Gegenwart. Süddeutscher Verlag, München 1991,

External links

  
 Old advertising (1923)
 

Beer and breweries in Bavaria
Brewery companies of Munich
Beer brands of Germany
Buildings and structures in Munich
1383 establishments in Europe
InBev brands